Towson University's College of Education comprises the departments of:

Early Childhood Education
Elementary Education
Secondary Education
Special Education
Educational Technology and Literacy
Instructional Leadership and Professional Development

In addition, the college is responsible for a number of specialized centers and institutes, including the Center for Educational Leadership, the Center for Professional Practice, the Maryland Writing Project, the [[Institute for Professional Development School Studies and the Towson Reading Clinic.
College of Fine Arts and Communication]].

External links
College of Education - Towson University Website

Education